This article lists the principal rivers of Europe with their main tributaries.

Scope

The border of Europe and Asia is here defined as from the Kara Sea, along the Ural Mountains and Ural River to the Caspian Sea. While the crest of the Caucasus Mountains is the geographical border with Asia in the south, Georgia, and to a lesser extent Armenia and Azerbaijan, are politically and culturally often associated with Europe; rivers in these countries are therefore included.

The list is at the outset limited to those rivers that are at least 250 km long from the most distant source, have a drainage basin (catchment area, watershed) of at least , or have a mean discharge (volume, flow) of at least . Also included are a number of rivers (currently 47) that do not meet these criteria, but are very well known and/or nearly make the mark. Examples of these are the Arno, Ruhr, Saar, and Clyde. See the lists of rivers for individual countries linked to at the bottom of the page for smaller rivers.

The rivers are ordered from those flowing to the extreme northeast into the Arctic Ocean, following the coastline anticlockwise all the way to the southeastern coast of the Black Sea. Iceland and the British Islands are included via virtual connections with northern Norway and across the Strait of Dover and the North Channel, respectively. Finally, rivers draining into the Caspian Sea are listed from Azerbaijan to the Ural River.

The table can be sorted by each column. The first three columns give a ranking for (maximum) length, area and volume of those rivers flowing into the sea or an endorheic lake down to the cut-off values. No ranking of tributaries is attempted, as the concept is too contentious; for example, hydrologically the middle and upper Volga could be considered a tributary of the Kama, in which case it would be the fifth or sixth longest river in Europe. Instead it does not appear in the table at all.

The commercial and geopolitical importance of rivers is not ranked here. As a transportation artery, a river may unite a region commercially and economically, but major rivers, as barriers to travel, may also form political boundaries between states. The Danube, the second longest river in Europe, is notable for flowing through or past ten countries; the Rhine through or past six. The Volga, the longest river in Europe, unites a huge region of European Russia; eleven of the twenty largest cities in Russia lie on its banks. The Loire and the Po unite important regions within France and Italy respectively. The most important rivers in Europe include Rhone, Elbe, Oder, Tagus, Thames, Don and Dnieper, among others.

Caveats
The measurements shown are drawn from sources deemed most reliable, but still are often uncertain, especially when other sources disagree wildly. For example, the Siret in Romania and Ukraine is 726 km long with a basin of 44,000 km2 according to the Great Soviet Encyclopedia, 647 km (44,811 km2) according to a Romanian management plan for the Siret basin  and 559 km (47,610 km2) according to the extensive transboundary rivers study by the Economic Commission for Europe.

Length estimates for rivers depend on a number of variables:
The estimate will be larger when the curves of the river are traced at a smaller scale.
The choice of the source obviously has an impact. Here we attempt to list the most distant source. When that involves a tributary nearer the mouth of the river, the length of the nominal river is listed as well, if it meets the above criteria.
Rivers flowing into estuaries have an arbitrary lower end. The channel of such a river through an estuary is usually included in the length when it is exposed at low tide.
The length of a watercourse through a reservoir or lake is open to interpretation. For this table, when a source for the total length of a river system involving lakes is lacking, the shortest possible course through the lakes is used
Over time, a river's length can change through canalization, the creation of reservoirs, and natural changes in the water course.

The catchment areas are more consistent between sources. However, in low relief the watershed is less obvious, while underground connections (especially in karst systems) further complicate area measurements. Unless excellent sources are available, the areas below 70°N latitude are taken from the HydroBASINS project. The River Networks and Ramsar Sites Information Service websites provide convenient interfaces to assess the accuracy of many of the basins. Areas for rivers above 70°N are warned and found to be less reliable.

The listed multiyear mean discharges are even less reliable than the lengths. Underestimates are most common, as the gauging stations are often far above the mouth, so that only a fraction of the drainage basin is represented. On the other hand, the highest volume of a river may not be at the mouth due to water loss by human usage, diversion (e.g. through distributaries), evaporation, or underground drainage.

Rivers of Europe

Rivers of Europe by length 

The longest rivers in Europe with their approximate lengths (incomplete list):

 Volga -   
 Danube - 
 Ural   -    
 Dnieper - 
 Don   -     
 Pechora - 
 - Kama -   (the longest left tributary of the Volga and the largest one in discharge)
 - Oka   -    (the longest right tributary of Volga)
 - Belaya -  (tributary of Kama)
 Dniester - 
 Rhine   -   
 - Desna -  (major left tributary of Dnieper)
 Elbe   -   
 - Donets   -    (major right tributary of Don River)
 Vistula - 
 Tagus   - 
 Daugava - 
 Loire - 
 - Tisza   -     ( before 1880) (tributary of the Danube)
 Ebro - 
 - Prut -  (tributary of the Danube)
 Neman - 
 - Sava -  (tributary of the Danube)
 Meuse - 
 Kuban - 
 Douro - 
 Mezen - 
 Oder - 
 Guadiana - 
 Rhône - 
 Kuma - 
 - Warta -  (major tributary of Oder)
 Seine  - 
 Mureș - 
 Northern Dvina - 
 - Vychegda -  (major left tributary of Northern Dvina)
 - Drava -  (tributary of the Danube)
 Po - 
 Guadalquivir - 
 Bolshoy Uzen - 
 - Siret -  (tributary of the Danube)
 - Maly Uzen -  (tributary of Bolshoy Uzen)
 Terek - 
 - Olt -  (tributary of the Danube)
 - Vashka -  (major tributary of Mezen)
 Glomma - (Norway's longest and most voluminous river)
 Garonne - 
 - Usa -  (major tributary of Pechora)
 Kemijoki - 
 - Great Morava -  (tributary of the Danube)
 - Moselle (longest left tributary of Rhine)
 - Main  (longest right tributary of Rhine)
 Torne - 
 Dalälven - 
 - Inn (tributary of the Danube)
 Maritsa - 
 Marne -  (major tributary of Seine)
 Neris - 
 Júcar - 
 Dordogne - 
 - Saône -  (major tributary of Rhône)
 Ume - 
 -- Mur -  (tributary of Drava)
 Ångerman - 
 - Klarälven -  (major tributary of the Göta älv)
 Lule - 
 Doubs - 
 Gauja - 
 Weser - 
 Kalix - 
 - Vindel River -  (major tributary of the Ume River)
 Ljusnan - 
 Indalsälven - 
 - Vltava -  (major tributary of the Elbe)
 Ponoy - 
 Ialomița - 
 Onega- 
 -- Someș -  (tributary of Tisza)
 Struma - 
 Adige - 
 Skellefte - 
 Tiber - 
 - Vah -  (tributary of the Danube)
 Pite - 
 - Faxälven -  (major tributary of the Ångerman)
 Vardar - 
 Shannon - 
 Charente - 
 - Iskar -  (tributary of the Danube)
 - Tundzha -  (major tributary of Maritsa)
 Ems - 
 Tana - 
 Scheldt - 
 - Timiș -  (tributary of the Danube)
 - Genil - 
 Severn - 
 - Morava -  (tributary of the Danube)
 Luga - 
 - Argeș -  (tributary of the Danube)
 Ljungan - 
 Minho - 
 Venta - 
 Thames - 
 - Drina -  (major tributary of Sava, Danube)
 - Jiu -   (tributary of the Danube)
 Drin - 
 Segura - 
 - Osam -  (tributary of the Danube)
 - Arda -  (tributary of Maritsa)
 - Yantra -  (tributary of the Danube)
 - Bosna -  (major tributary of Sava, Danube)
 Kamchiya - 
 Mesta -

Rivers of Europe by discharge 
This is an incomplete list of the largest rivers of Europe by discharge:
 Volga - 
 Danube - 
 Pechora - 
 - Kama -  (the longest left tributary of the Volga and the largest one in discharge)
 Northern Dvina - 
 Neva - 
 Rhône - 
 Dnieper - 
 - Sava -  (tributary of the Danube)
 Po -  (largest river in Italy)
 - Usa -  (major tributary of Pechora)
 - Oka -  (the longest right tributary of the Volga)
 - Vychegda -  (major left tributary of Northern Dvina)
 Vistula - 
 Don - 
 Mezen - 
 - Vyatka -  (tributary of the Kama, Volga)
 Loire - 
 - Tisza -  (tributary of the Danube)
 Elbe - 
 - Belaya -  (tributary of the Kama, Volga)
 - Svir -  (tributary of Neva, through Lake Onega)
 - Inn -  (tributary of the Danube)
 Douro -  (Most voluminous river in Iberian Peninsula)
 Glomma -  (Norway's longest and most voluminous river)
 Göta älv - 
 Lule älv - 
 Ångermanälven - 
 Indalsälven - 
 Umeälven - 
 Kuban River - 
 Maritsa - 
 Meuse - 
 Dniester - 
 - Neretva - 
 - Una -  (tributary of Sava, which is a tributary of the Danube)
 - Great Morava -  (tributary of the Danube)
 Vardar - 
 - Bosna -  (tributary of Sava, which is a tributary of the Danube)
 - Vrbas -  (tributary of Sava, which is a tributary of the Danube)
 - Drina -  (tributary of Sava, which is a tributary of the Danube)
 - Arda -  (tributary of Maritsa)
 Struma - 
 - Iskar -  (tributary of the Danube)
 - Yantra -  (tributary of the Danube)
 Mesta - 
 - Tundzha -  (tributary of Maritsa)
 Kamchiya -

Notes

References
SWRR = State Water Register of Russia; GSE = Great Soviet Encyclopedia, 1969–1978 edition; IEU = Internet Encyclopedia of Ukraine.

See also

List of rivers of Asia
List of rivers of Africa
List of rivers of the Americas
List of rivers of Oceania
List of drainage basins by area
List of rivers by discharge
List of rivers by length
List of European rivers with alternative names
European river zonation
Geography of Europe
Latin names of European rivers

Europe
List of rivers of Europe
Rivers